San Francisco Golf Club is an athletic club and private social club in San Francisco, California, with a portion of the course extending into neighboring Daly City. It is one of the most exclusive private membership clubs in the United States. In Golfdigest's 2015-2016 ranking of America's best golf courses, San Francisco Golf Club secured the 35th best course.

History
San Francisco Golf Club was one of seven golf clubs West of the Allegheny Mountains when it was founded in 1895. It had its beginning at the Presidio of San Francisco as a nine-hole course. It was moved to 19th and Ocean streets in 1904 and to its present location in 1915.

The course was designed by noted American golf course architect A.W. Tillinghast.  The course's signature 7th hole overlooks the site of the final legal duel in California.

Notable members
 Charles R. Schwab
 Condoleezza Rice

See also
 List of golf courses designed by A. W. Tillinghast
 List of American gentlemen's clubs

References

Golf clubs and courses in California
Gentlemen's clubs in California
Sports venues in San Francisco
1885 establishments in California